Mi Na (born 1980) is a Chinese painter.

Mi was born in Anshun, Guizhou in 1980. She received her master's degree from Minzu University of China and joined the faculty of Beijing Union University.

Mi received the Gold Reward of the Qi Baishi Young Artists Price in 2004.

References

1980 births
Living people
21st-century Chinese women artists
21st-century Chinese artists
Minzu University of China alumni
Painters from Guizhou
People from Anshun
Chinese women painters